Enikő Győri (born 17 July 1968) is a Hungarian conservative politician and elected
Member of the European Parliament (MEP) with Fidesz.

She left the European Parliament on 31 August 2010 to take up a position as State Secretary for European Affairs in her native Hungary.

Education
She earned her degree at the University of Economics, Budapest, Faculty of International Relations in 1992, PhD in 2000. In 1997 she participated at the course offered by École National d’Administration (ENA).

She undertook traineeships in the United States, Belgium, France, Mexico and Spain. Traineeship at the French National Assembly (1998), at the Council of Europe (1998), and at the European Commission (1995).

Languages spoken: English, Italian, Spanish (excellent), French (intermediate).

Employment
Minister of State for European Affairs, Ministry of Foreign Affairs (2010-2011).

Member of the European Parliament (2009-2010), member of the Economic and Monetary Committee.

Head of EU Staff of Fidesz Political Group in the Hungarian National Assembly (2003-2009).

Ambassador of the Hungary to Italy (1999-2003).

Adviser on EU affairs of the Hungarian National Assembly (1992-1999).

Lecturer at ELTE University in Budapest (2004-2009) and Eszterházy Teachers’ College in Eger (1995-1998).

Public Activity
Hungarian member of the working group on “European politics” of the European People's Party (2005-2009).

President of the Italian Forum of Budapest (2004-).

Member of the Board of the Political Science Review, Hungary (2007-).

Director of Free Europe Centre (2004-2009).

Publications
National Parliaments and the European Union, Osiris, 2004.

Co-author of several publications about European integration.

Reports on Latin-America and on the US in the weekly HVG (1991–1992).

Personal
Married, she has two children.

See also
2009 European Parliament election in Hungary

External links
CV available at the Ministry for Foreign Affairs of the Republic of Hungary

References

1968 births
Living people
Women MEPs for Hungary
Fidesz MEPs
MEPs for Hungary 2009–2014
MEPs for Hungary 2019–2024
Ambassadors of Hungary to Spain
Ambassadors of Hungary to Italy
20th-century Hungarian politicians
20th-century Hungarian women politicians
21st-century Hungarian politicians